Government School, Kanwari is a government funded school located in Kanwari village of Hisar district in the Indian state of Haryana.

History
A government co-educational primary school existed in Kanwari since 1940s, which was progressively upgraded to middle, high and finally to secondary school. In early 1990s, a new school was built and old school was converted into girls-only school.

Academics
The schools offer classes till 10+2.

See also 

 Govt. Girls School, Kanwari
 List of Universities and Colleges in Hisar
 List of schools in Hisar
 List of institutions of higher education in Haryana
 Thakur Dass Bhargava Senior Secondary Model School
 Dayanand college
 Babasaheb Naik College of Engineering, Pusad

External links

References 

Private schools in Haryana
Boys' schools in India